Shelly Anne Simonds (born November 9, 1967) is an American educator and politician serving in the Virginia House of Delegates, representing the 94th district. She was first elected in 2019. During the 2013 and 2017 elections, Simonds was Democratic candidate for Virginia's 94th House of Delegates district in Newport News, Virginia.

2019 election

In 2019, Simonds ran for a third time against Delegate Yancey, however this time in a redrawn district which had a majority of Democratic-registered voters. Simonds won the November 2019 election to become Virginia's 94th district House of Delegates representative with 57.7% of the votes cast, against multiple opponents.

2017 election

After a close election November 7, 2017, Simonds was 10 votes behind her opponent. A recount was held in December and Simonds was declared winner by 1 vote. The next day, a 3-judge panel declared that a previously uncounted ballot in which both candidates' bubbles had been filled, but which Simonds' bubble was crossed out should have been counted for the Republican David Yancey—leaving the election a tie.

On December 27, 2017, Simonds filed a motion asking judges to reconsider count of the double-marked ballot. On January 3, 2018, the recount panel rejected the motion. Drawing by lot was scheduled for the following day. On January 4, 2018, the Virginia Election Board certified that Yancey was the winner after a drawing by lot. Simonds declined to request another recount, to which she was entitled for losing the drawing, stating that "she did not expect to prevail in a dispute that captured national attention".

References

1967 births
21st-century American educators
21st-century American politicians
21st-century American women politicians
Educators from Virginia
21st-century American women educators
Living people
Democratic Party members of the Virginia House of Delegates
Politicians from Newport News, Virginia